Joshua Kearney Mullin (born 23 September 1992) is a Scottish professional footballer who plays as a midfielder for Ayr United.

He is in his second spell at Livingston and has also previously played for East Stirlingshire, Albion Rovers, Ross County, Hamilton Academical and Livingston, as well as junior clubs Pollok and Kilbirnie Ladeside.

Career
Having been signed as a youth player with a number of clubs, Mullin dropped down to the Scottish Juniors with Pollok and Kilbirnie Ladeside.

Mullin's first appearance in senior football arrived when he signed for Scottish League Two club Albion Rovers in August 2014, having signed a pre-contract agreement with the club in March 2014. His debut came as a second-half substitute for Gary Fisher, in a 2–2 draw with Airdrieonians in the Scottish Challenge Cup in July 2014, whilst his first goal for the side was a 91st-minute strike in a 2–0 victory over Annan Athletic.

After helping Rovers to the League Two title and leaving the Rovers in a secure position in the top half of League One, Mullin signed a two-year deal for Scottish Championship club Livingston on 1 February 2016, for an undisclosed fee. Following the club's relegation to Scottish League One in May 2016, Mullin helped Livingston return to the Scottish Championship at the first attempt, with four goals and five assists in 27 appearances.

Ross County announced the signing of Mullin on 28 May 2018 after he left Livingston under freedom of contract. In his first season with the club Mullin helped County gain promotion back to the Scottish Premiership by winning the Scottish Championship and the Scottish Challenge Cup, coming off of the bench in the final of the latter to score twice. On 2 October 2020, Mullin departed Ross County, after his request to leave was accepted.

On 5 October 2020, Mullin returned to Livingston for a second spell, signing until the end of the 2020–21 season, with the option of a further two years. He made his debut the following day, scoring twice in a 5–1 win away to Edinburgh City in the Scottish League Cup.

In August 2021 he moved on loan to Hamilton Academical. Mullin scored his first goal for Hamilton Academical on 26 December 2021 versus Kilmarnock

Mullin joined Ayr United on a season long loan in August 2022. On 31 January 2023, Mullin would depart his parent club Livingston by mutual consent, and would join Ayr United on a permanent deal the same day.

Career statistics

Honours
Albion Rovers
 Scottish League Two: 2014–15

Livingston
Scottish League One: 2016–17

Ross County 
Scottish Championship: 2018–19
Scottish Challenge Cup: 2018–19

References

External links

1992 births
Living people
Scottish footballers
Association football midfielders
East Stirlingshire F.C. players
Pollok F.C. players
Kilbirnie Ladeside F.C. players
Albion Rovers F.C. players
Livingston F.C. players
Scottish Professional Football League players
Ross County F.C. players
Ayr United F.C. players
Hamilton Academical F.C. players